Won Yoo-hyun (born February 4, 1988, in South Korea) is a Korean soccer goalkeeper. He currently plays for TTM Phichit F.C. in the 2011 Thai Premier League.

References

External links 
 

1988 births
Association football goalkeepers
South Korean footballers
South Korean expatriate footballers
Living people
Ulsan Hyundai FC players
K League 1 players
Expatriate footballers in Thailand
South Korean expatriate sportspeople in Thailand